Mohd Ifwat Akmal bin Chek Kassim (born 10 August 1996) is a Malaysian professional footballer who plays as goalkeeper for Malaysian club Kedah Darul Aman and the Malaysia national team.

Club career

Kedah Darul Aman
Ifwat began his career with Kedah Darul Aman U-21 who has competed in the President Cup.

Career statistics

Club

Honours

Club
Kedah Darul Aman
 Malaysia FA Cup: 2017, 2019
 Malaysia Cup: 2016
 Malaysia Charity Shield: 2017
 Malaysia Super League runner-up: 2020, 2021
 Malaysia Cup runner-up: 2017, 2019

International
Malaysia U-23
Southeast Asian Games
 Silver Medal: 2017

Individual
 Man Of The Match Malaysia FA Cup Final: 2019
 FAM Football Awards – Best Goalkeeper Award: 2017
 Kedah Sports Awards 2016 – Promising Athele
 PFAM Player of the Month: March 2019

References

External links
 

1996 births
Living people
Malaysian footballers
Kedah Darul Aman F.C. players
Malaysian people of Malay descent
People from Kedah
Malaysia Super League players
Southeast Asian Games silver medalists for Malaysia
Southeast Asian Games medalists in football
Association football goalkeepers
Footballers at the 2018 Asian Games
Competitors at the 2017 Southeast Asian Games
Asian Games competitors for Malaysia
21st-century Malaysian people